Eric A. Morris is an assistant professor of city and regional planning, specializing in transportation, at Clemson University, and a former television writer.

Morris grew up in Deerfield, Illinois. He attended Harvard University, where he received an A.B. magna cum laude in history and literature. He also holds an M.A. and a Ph.D. in urban planning from UCLA.

His television writing credits include
Star Trek: Voyager, JAG, Xena: Warrior Princess, The Pretender, and The Outer Limits. He also created the comedy/action series Jack of All Trades.

Morris' primary research foci are transportation, land use and well-being; transportation history; and transportation and disadvantaged populations. In addition to teaching and research at Clemson, Morris writes about transportation for the "Freakonomics" blog.

References

External links
 Official Eric A. Morris Web site
 Eric A. Morris TV Credits
 
 Freakonomics blogs

American television writers
American male television writers
UCLA Luskin School of Public Affairs alumni
Harvard University alumni
Year of birth missing (living people)
Living people